Divergence in linguistics refers to one of the five principles by which grammaticalization can be detected  while it is taking place. The other four are: layering, specialisation, persistence, and de-categorialisation.

Divergence names a state of affairs subsequent to some change, namely the result of the process called “split” by Heine and Reh. “When a lexical form undergoes grammaticalization to a clitic or affix, the original form may remain as an autonomous lexical element and undergo the same changes as ordinary lexical items.” (Hopper 1991: 22) A possible formal distinction between divergence and split would be that the latter seems to be confined to cases where one and the same source has several targets, whereas the former merely refers to the drifting apart of previously more similar items.

The form of a lexical item may undergo different changes from its grammaticalised counterpart.

References 

 Lessau, Donald A. A Dictionary of Grammaticalization. Bochum: Brockmeyer, 1994.
 Hopper, Paul J. “On some principles of grammaticization”. In Elizabeth Closs Traugott and Bernd Heine, eds. Approaches to Grammaticalization, Vol. I. Amsterdam: John Benjamins, 1991. pp. 17–36.

Historical linguistics